Ilija Bozoljac and Michael Venus were the defending champions, but they did not participate this year.

Guillermo Durán and Horacio Zeballos won the title, defeating Dennis Novikov and Julio Peralta in the final, 6–4, 6–3.

Seeds

Draw

References
 Main Draw

Savannah Challenger - Doubles